William Twomey (born 14 April 1977) is an Irish equestrian and is Ireland's highest ranked show jumper.

Rolex World Ranking
Twomey had been steadily climbing up the World Rankings for years until finally, in June 2011 (Ranking no. 125) he reached his highest ever Ranking of 3rd place. Here, he also took over (from Denis Lynch) the highest ranked Irish rider in the World

As of the end of March 2012, Twomey is ranked 17th in the World – Ireland's No. 2.

Notable horses
Luidam Stallion / Chestnut / 1993 / Guidam x Acteur – owned by Billy Twomey and Sue Davies

Twomey and Luidam were members of the winning Nations Cup teams in St. Gallen and Aachen in 2003. They also won the 5* Grand Prix of La Baule and were 2nd in the 5* Grands Prix of St. Gallen and Dublin. The pair were also short-listed for the Olympic Games of 2004.

Je t'Aime Flamenco Stallion / Bay / 2000 / Flamence de Semilly x Landetto – owned by Mrs. Sue Davies

Winner of 7 International Grands Prix, including the five-stars at GCT-Valencia 2011, Barcelona in 2010 and St. Gallen in 2009.

Tinka's Serenade Mare / Chestnut / 1997 / Tinka's Boy x African Drum – owned by Billy Twomey and Sue Davies

winner of the Rolex IJRC Top Ten Final at the Gucci Masters in Paris, France, 2011. A member of the winning Irish team in Aachen and Lummen in 2010. Finished 11th in the World Championships of 2010. She has also jumped double-clears in some of the world's biggest Grands Prix, including winning the five-stars at Basel and Zurich in 2011.

Allegro Gelding / Bay / 2000 / Bon Ami x Zarola – owned by Billy Twomey and Anthony Condon .

Shared with Anthony Condon, Allegro won the B&C in Addington. Consistently jumping up to 1.40m with both Billy and Anthony.

Romanov Stallion / Chestnut / 1998 / Heartbreaker x Fedor

Since the partnership began in late 2010, the pair have been on the winning Irish Nations Cup team at the CSIO5* at La Baule in 2011, and placed second in the CSI3* Grand Prix of Laipzig, 2011.

Jumping career

2003
Winner of La Baule GP (France) with Luidam

2004
Winner of Maubeuge GP (France) with Whinnie Jackson

2008
In 2008, Twomey won the HOYS Grand Prix with his eight-year-old stallion named Je T'aime Flamenco. Twomey's time was 0.23 seconds faster than the runner up, Michael Whitaker.

2010
For the second year running, Twomey and Je T'aime Flamenco took the top spot in the 4* Grand Prix of Amsterdam in January.

In February, Billy, with Je T'aime Flamenco, was selected as part of the Irish Nations Cup Team that competed in Dubai. The Irish Team finished 7th of the 11 that started. The duo then went on to be the highest placed of the Irish in the €300,000 Grand Prix, finishing 8th.

Towards the end of April, Twomey was selected as part of Ireland's Nations Cup Team in Lummen, Belgium. He was selected as last to jump (with Tinka's Serenade). Denis Lynch (with Abberuail van het Dingeshof) was first to go, followed by Alex Duffy (Tampa), and Shane Breen (Carmena Z). In the first round they all jumped clear apart from Alex Duffy, who had 22 faults. As Duffy had the discarded score, he did not jump in the second round. The remaining trio then produced 3 more clear rounds to tie for first place with Australia. The jump-off saw Chris Chugg of Australia go head-to-head with Billy Twomey, with Chugg having four faults and Twomey jumping his third clear round of the competition to secure the win for Ireland. Twomey also directed the grey Irish Sport Horse – Cavinem – to 4th in a Table A class. To end the show, he directed Tinka's Serenade to 8th in the Grand Prix.

Twomey travelled to Hamburg for the second leg of the Global champions Tour. The show started well with him securing 6th place (with Tinka's Serenade) in the 'Mercedes-Benz Championat of Hamburg' – only 0.4 seconds behind the winner, but unfortunate to have 4 faults in the jump-off.

Twomey was then selected for the Irish team at the second leg of the Meydan Nations Cup series at the CSIO5* of Rome. In the opening class – a 1m40 speed class – he finished in 5th with Cavenim. Twomey was last to jump for the Irish team that finished equal 3rd in the Nations Cup on 12 faults: Cameron Hanley (Southwind VDL) – (8)/4; Darragh Kenny (Obelix) – 4/(8); Cian O'Connor (K Club Lady) – 4/0; Billy Twomey (Tinka's Serenade) – 0/4. On the final day, Twomey directed Cavenim to 6th place in the 1m45 speed class.

He was again selected to represent Ireland at the third leg of the Meydan Nations Cup Series at the CSIO5* St. Gallen, Switzerland. The team finished 4th in the Nations Cup which brought them up two places on the overall leader-board to 4th. Twomey was selected as last to go on Je T'aime Flamenco and they were the only partnership on the Irish team to complete a faultless round: Shane Breen (Carmena Z) 5/5; Darragh Kenny (Obelix) 5/(16); Cian O'Connor (K Club Lady) 9/4; Billy Twomey (Je T'aime Flamenco) (9)/0. Although Twomey won no classes at the show, he had a very successful week leading to him capturing the Leading Rider of the Show. Cavenim secured a 3rd and 4th in two Table C speed classes – picking up 12,500 CHF. Tinka's Serenade finished 3rd in a 1m50 Table A speed class, and 5th in a 1m45 jump-off class – picking up 6,600 CHF. Je T'aime Flamenco then topped off the week by finishing 4th (and winning 30,000 CHF) in the Grand Prix with just one time fault in each round.

Next on the calendar for Twomey was the 4th leg of the Global Champions Tour in Cannes, France. On day 2, he directed Sue Davies Tinka's Serenade to 2nd place in the 1m50 jump-off class. They were less than half a second off the pace, and collected €4,000.

For the final weekend of June, Towmey travelled to Monte Carlo for the 5th leg of the Global Champions Tour. He got off to a good start steering his new ride Tackeray into 2nd place in a 1m45 speed class. The competition was won by fellow Irishman Denis Lynch. On Saturday, he took third place and €3,000 in the 1m50 jump-off class, again, with Michelle Gatland's Tackeray. In the Grand Prix on Saturday Twomey chose to ride Je t'Aime Flamenco. They jumped a faultless first round and had 4 faults in the second to finish 10th.

Twomey flew straight from Monte Carlo to Hickstead (UK) for the DFS Hickstead Derby on Sunday. After misplacing his passport, and the plane arriving 2 hours late, he made it just in time to warm-up for the class! He rode Sue Davies Blue Thunder and had four faults to finish 3rd and collect nearly £9,000.

Back to the Global Champions Tour next – this time at the CSI5* Estoril, Portugal. Twomey started well by jumping clear with Je t'Aime Flamenco in the opening class (on Friday) – a 1m50 speed class – to finish 6th and collect €600. The clear rounds continued for him as he jumped a double clear on Tackeray to finish 2nd (and collect €5,000) in the 'Trophy Massimo Dutti' – a 1m45 jump-off class that evening. In a GCT Grand Prix that saw only six (out of 39) make it through the first two rounds to the jump-off, Twomey had 4 faults in Round B settling for 9th place and €6,000.

On his way to Aachen for the World Equestrian Festival, Twomey stopped off at the inaugural 'Royal Festival of the Horse' at Stoneleigh Park in the UK. He won the Grand Prix (and £10,000) on Tinka's Serenade, beating John Whitaker and his 2008 Olympic ride – Peppermill – into second place.

The World Equestrian Festival at the CHIO5* Aachen, Germany was next for Twomey. In the opening competition, he steered Tackeray to 8th place. He then rode Tinka's Serenade to 5th place in the second class of the show. In the 6th leg of the Meydan FEI Nations Cup on Thursday, the Irish team finished on a 4 fault score to win: Billy Twomey ( Tinka's Serenade) 4/0; Dermott Lennon (Hallmark Elite) 0/0; Cian O'Connor (K Club Lady) 0/0; Denis Lynch (Lantinus) (4)/(NS). On Saturday, Twomey landed the Accumulater with Tackeray, bagging €6,600. Twomey opted to ride Je t'Aime Flamenco in Sunday's Grand Prix, and finished 7th with 4 faults in the second round to take home another €8,000 from the show.

Twomey was once again selected as part of the Irish Team – this time at the Royal International Horse Show at Hickstead, Great Britain. Although he didn't have the most successful week, he helped the Irish Team secure their future in the Meydan FEI Nations Cup for another year by earning 3 points by finishing 6th in the Nations Cup on Friday, which was won by the host nation; Shane Breen (Carmena Z) 12/9; Dermott Lennon (Hallmark Elite) 9/(EL); Billy Twomey (Je t'Aime Flamenco) 5/1; Denis Lynch (Nabab's Son) 12/0.

The final of the Meydan FEI Nations Cup was next for Twomey. This was held on 'home territory' at the RDS Showgrounds in Dublin, Ireland. On Day 2, he directed Je t'Aime Flamenco to 3rd place in the 1m50 – 1m60 'Power and Speed' class. In the Nations Cup on Friday, Ireland finished joint 2nd on 20 faults with the USA: Billy Twomey (Tinka's Serenade) 0/4; Dermott Lennon (Hallmark Elite) (12)/(8); Cian O'Connor (K Club Lady) 8/0; Denis Lynch (Nabab's Son) 8/0. This result secured Ireland 4th place in the overall standings. On Saturday, Twomey and Tinka's Serenade won the 'Dublin Stakes' – a 1m50 jump-off class. The Longines International Grand Prix on Sunday marked the return to form for Je t'Aime Flamenco, as Twomey steered the 10yo stallion to 3rd place, picking up €26,000.

Next was the Final of the Global Champions Tour at the CSI5* Rio de Janeiro. Although he had no luck in the €300,000 Grand Prix, he still managed to collect nearly €20,000 in prize money, most of this coming from Tinka's Serenade 3rd in the 1m45 jump-off class.

Twomey then travelled to the CSI5* Barcelona, Spain with 3 of his horses. He made his intentions clear by winning the opening class – a 1m45 speed class – with Cavinem and collected €1,500. On day 2, the pair also took the honours in the Accumulator class earning €3,100. He and Je t'Aime Flamenco then went on to take the €120,000 Grand Prix and collect the keys to a Seat car and €10,000.

Billy then traveled to Kentucky as part of the Irish Team to the Alltech FEI World Equestrian Games, Jumping World Championships: (Dermott Lennon – Hallmark Elite; Denis Lynch – Lantinus; Cian O’Connor – K Club Lady; Billy Twomey – Tinka’s Serenade. After the opening competition – a Speed Class – Twomey lay in 44th on just 5.54 faults, and the Team lay in 8th – less than 8 faults of Gold. Day 2 saw the Nations Cup competition. After the first round, Twomey jumped up to 13th after jumping clear, and the Team had dropped to 12th – missing the cut to jump in the second round and fight for Olympic qualification. As Twomey was ranked so highly in the Individual rankings, he was invited to jump in the final round of the Nations Cup. Here he picked up just 1 time fault to move up to 8th. Day 3 saw the 'Top 30 Grand Prix'. The pair picked up 8 faults in the first round but bounced back with a great clear in the second round to finish in 11th place overall on a final total of 14.54 faults.

CSI5*-W Verona, Italy: In the Rolex FEI World Cup qualifier, Twomey and Tinka's Serenade finished 5th and collected €11,500.

CSI5*-W Stuttgart German Masters: In the feature class on Friday, Twomey steered Sue Davies' Tinka's Serenade to 5th place and €1,400. On Saturday, in the 1m50 'Firma' Prize, he and Je t'Aime Flamenco jumped double-clear to finish 4th and earn €1,600. In the six-bar that evening, Twomey and Tinka's Serenade jumped two rounds to finish 3rd and earn over €2,500. In the Rolex FEI World Cup qualifier, he (and Tinka's Serenade) missed out on the top prize of a brand new Mercedes-Benz by 0.38 of a second – they finished 3rd to earn €23,000.

CSI5*-W Audi Masters Brussels, Belgium: In the opening class on Friday night – a 1m50 jump-off class – Twomey and Je t'Aime Flamenco finished 2nd to take €8,000. In the Rolex FEI World Cup Qualifier – the Audi Grand Prix, the pair went on to collect 10th prize of €5,000.

CSI5* Gucci Masters, Paris, France: In the Gucci Grand Prix – which featured the world's top riders – Twomey and Tinka's Serenade jumped a double clear to take 5th prize of €24,000. The pair also took 3rd prize of €7,500 in the opening class – a 1m50 jump-off class.

CSI5*-W London Olympia, England: The feature class of the week – the Rolex FEI World Cup – took place on Sunday afternoon. Here, Twomey and Tinka's Serenade were just 0.02 second behind his former mentor Michael Whitaker to take second prize of €18,000. In the first of the World Ranking classes, the same pair finished 4th in the 1m55 jump-off class to take €2,500. Then, in the feature class on Saturday night, Twomey partnered Je t'Aime Flamenco to 4th prize of €2,160 in the 1m60 jump-off class.

Twomey climbed to his highest ever Rolex World Ranking at the end of December 2010 – 7th.

In the 'FEI Combination in Jumping Rankings' produced at the end of 2010, Twomey was the only rider in the world to have two horses in the top 25, Tinka's Serenade in 6th, and Je t'Aime Flamenco in 24th

2011

CSI5* Basel, Switzerland: Here, Twomey and Tinka's Serenade took the top prize of €70,000 in the Grand Prix on Sunday (beating Germany's Marcus Ehning and Nolte's Kuchengirl into second). The pair also took 4th prize of €7,700 in the feature class on Friday, the 'Championat of Stadt Basel' – a 1m50 jump-off class.

CSI4* Amsterdam, The Netherlands: Romanov II opened Billy's weekend by taking 4th prize of €1,000 in a 1m45 two-phase competition.

CSI5*-W Zurich, Switzerland: On the opening night, Twomey and Tinka's Serenade took the top prize of €35,000 in the Rolex Grand Prix. The pair's incredible form continued the following day when they earned €23,400 by winning the Liebherr-Prize – a 1m50 two-phase class – beating Ireland's Denis Lynch into second place. The pair swapped places in the following class where Twomey finished second on Romanov to collect €4,677. He wrapped-up the show by finishing 11th with Je t'Aime Flamenco in the Rolex FEI World Cup Qualifier – earning a further €3,178.

CSI5*-W Bordeaux, France: In the Rolex FEI World Cup qualifier, Twomey and Je t'Aime Flamenco jumped one of eleven double-clears to finish 4th to earn €15,000.

CSI5*-W Gothenburg, Sweden: Twomey and Je t'Aime Flamenco posted the fastest time in the Grand Prix, but at the expense of 4 faults, they had to settle for 5th prize of €4,500.

CSI5* Global Champions Tour Doha, Qatar: In the 1m45/1m50 jump-off class on Friday night, he directed Je t'Aime Flamenco to within 0.12 second of the winner to finish 2nd and earn €12,000.

CSI5* 'Saut Hermès' Paris, France: Twomey and Romanov II teamed up with Luciana Diniz and Licapo in the 1m60 pairs competition on Saturday night to finish 6th and collect €1,250

CSI-W Final, Rolex FEI World Cup Final, Leipzig, Germany: In the Final Part I, Tinka's Serenade had 4 faults to earn €1,100 in prize-money, but left Billy lying in 16th position overall on 28 points – 16 points behind the leader, Marco Kutscher.

CSI3* Leipzig, Germany: Here, he partnered Romanov to second place in the Grand Prix taking €17,000 in prize-money.

CSI5* Global Champions Tour of Valencia, Spain: Twomey and Je t'Aime Flamenco jumped a treble-clear to win the GCT Grand Prix taking €92,000 and beating Ludger Beerbaum into second place. This win brought Twomey up to 7th place in the GCT rankings. Tackeray also had a good show, taking 3rd prize of €2,990 in the 'Massimo Dutti' 1m45 jump-off class, and another €1,840 in prize money by finishing 7th in two 1m45 speed classes.

CSIO5* La Baule, France: FEI Nations Cup: 1st on 13 faults: Shane Sweetnam (Amaretto Darco) 1/4; Billy Twomey (Romanov) 4/4; Cian O'Connor (Larkhill Cruiser) (4)/0; Cameron Hanley (Southwind VDL) 0/(17) – Team earned €64,000. Billy and Tackeray also finished second to Nick Skelton (Big Star) in a 1m50 speed class on Friday, earning €4,600. Twomey and Je t'Aime Flamenco posted the fastest time in the €200,000 Grand Prix jump-off but at the expense of 4 faults to finish 7th and take €6,000. The Grand Prix was won by the reigning Olympic Champion partnership of Eric Lamaze and Hickstead.

CSIO5* Rome, Italy: FEI Nations Cup: 3rd on 21 faults: Shane Sweetnam (Amaretto Darco) 8/4; Shane Carey (Lancero) 5/4; Cameron Hanley (Southwind VDL) (9)/(9); Billy Twomey (Tinka's Serenade) 0/0 – Team earned €32,000.

CSI5* Global Champions Tour of Hamburg, Germany: Twomey once again chose to ride Je t'Aime Flamenco in the GCT Grand Prix, but 4 faults in each round dropped the pair to 16th position, earning €1,900, but climbed to 6th place in the overall GCT Rankings.

CSI5* Global Champions Tour of Monte Carlo, Monaco: Romanov II took third prize of €3,000 in a 1m50 on Saturday. Twomey and Tinka's serenade also collected €2,000 by finishing 18th in the Grand Prix.

CSI5* Global Champions Tour Estoril. Portugal: Romanov II took 11th place in the 1m50 'Massimo Dutti' class to earn €2,820, and 15th in the Grand Prix for €2,800.

CSIO5* World Equestrian Festival, Aachen, Germany: The Irish team finished 2nd in the FEI Nations Cup on Thursday night: Shane Breen (Carmena Z) 8/0; Shane Sweetnam (Amaretto d'Arco) 0/4; Denis Lynch (All Inclusive NRW) 4/0; Billy Twomey (Tinka's Serenade) (8)/(5). On the opening day, Twomey also guided Tinka's Serenade to 2nd prize of €8,000 in the 1m50 class. Twomey and Tinka's Serenade also picked up €4,500 in the Grand Prix after jumping a faultless first round and retiring in the second, settling for 18th position.

CSI5* Royal International Horse Show, Hickstead, Great Britain: Twomey and Je t'Aime Flamenco had 4 faults in the Grand Prix to take 12th prize of €1,000.

CSIO5* 'Discover Ireland' RDS Dublin Horse Show, Ireland: The Irish team finished 2nd in the FEI Nations Cup on Saturday: Billy Twomey (Tinka's Serenade) 0/(Ret)/ jump-off for first place: Retired; Shane Sweetnam (Amaretto d'Arco) 0/0; Nicola Fitzgibbon (Puissance) 4/0; Denis Lynch (All Inclusive NRW) (5)/4. On Sunday, Twomey and Cavinem earned €2,200 by finishing 4th in the Speed Derby.

CSIO5* Rotterdam, the Netherlands: Tinka's Serenade finished 9th in the Grand Prix to take €4,000.

CSI5* GCT Rio de Janeiro, Brazil: Je t'Aime Flamenco picked up €2,000 for 5th prize in the Accumulator, and €1,400 in a 1m45 winning-round class by finishing 9th.

CES5* European Championships, Madrid, Spain: Shane Sweetnam (Amaretto d'Arco) 3.46/8/8; Nicola Fitzgibbon (Puissance) (9.74)/(21)/(20); Denis Lynch (Lantinus) 8.71/9/4; Billy Twomey (Tinka's Serenade) 0.95/0/12; After round 1, Ireland lay 9th on 13.12 faults behind France in the lead on 2.95, and Twomey lay in 6th place individually (and earned €1,640). Twomey's second round clear left him in second individually, and Ireland in 7th position. Ireland's third round performance saw them drop out of Olympic qualification to 9th place. In this round, Twomey was jumping clear until the final line where 3 fences fell, dropping him to 18th position individually. On Sunday, in the Individual Final, Tinka's Serenade had 8 faults in round 1, and jumped clear in round 2. This brought them up to 15th position in the end.

CSI3* Madrid, Spain: Je t'Aime Flamenco took 4th prize of €6,000 in the 1m55 Grand Prix.

Major Championship Festival, Arena UK, Grantham, UK: Romanov took 2nd prize of £10,000 (€11,500) in the Major Open.

Tinka's Serenade was ranked the 7th best horse in the world in 2011 according to the FEI WBFSH World Ranking List.

CSI5*-W Helsinki, Finland: Romanov II took 7th prize of €4,000 in the Rolex FEI World Cup.

CSI5*-W Lyon, France: In the Equita'Masters on Saturday night, Tinka's Serenade took 3rd prize of €15,000.

CSI5*-W Stuttgart, Germany: Twomey and Tinka's Serenade finished second in the 'Mercedes' German Masters to earn €16,000. The pair also finished 5th in a 1m50 one-round class earlier in the day to take €1,600 in prize-money.

CSI5* GCT Final, Abu Dhabi, UAE: Tinka's Serenade jumped 0/4 in the Grand Prix to earn €4,000 for 13th prize. This result meant Twomey finished in 12th position in the overall GCT Rankings of 2011, earning a further €10,000.

CSI5* 'Gucci Masters' Paris, France: Twomey won the Rolex IJRC Top Ten Final with Tinka's Serenade picking up €50,000 and an €8,000 Rolex Watch. Romanov also picked up €2,500 for finishing in 9th position of the Gucci by Gucci Challenge.

At the Show Jumping Ireland Ball in December, Billy Twomey was awarded the highest accolade of 'International Rider of the Year'.

2012

CSI5* Basel, Switzerland: Tinka's Serenade jumped a treble-clear in the Grand Prix – good enough for 4th prize of 45,000CHF (€37,238). Romanov had a time fault in the first round, so had to settle for 12th prize of 2,500CHF (€2,065) in the feature class on the opening day.

CSI5*-W Leipzig, Germany: Tinka's Serenade was again on top form. Firstly she finished 2nd to the reigning European Champion – Rolf-Goran Bengsston and Ninja La Silla – in the qualifier for the world cup to earn €16,500. She then took 4th prize in the Rolex FEI World Cup to earn €15,000.

CSI5*-W Zurich, Switzerland: A relatively new horse to Twomey – Wing's Sublieme – earned €2,490 (3,000CHF) for 4th prize in a 1m45 jump-off class. Romanov picked up a further €2,490 (3,000CHF) in a 1m50 two-phase; and Tinka's Serenade took 12th prize of €1,245 (1,500CHF) in the Rolex Grand Prix.

CSI5* 'Saut Hermes' Paris, France: Tinka's Serenade and Twomey were good enough for 3rd position in the €200,000 'Hermes' Grand Prix to earn €30,000. Romanov also took a share of the prize-money by winning a 1m45 jump-off worth €7,590 to the winner, and €2,587 for 6th place in a 1m45-1m50 competition.

CSI5* GCT Doha, Qatar: To here, Twomey brought Tinka's Serenade and Romanov, who picked up €51,700 in prize money between them. Tinka's Serenade picked up the bulk of this of €45,000 for finishing 4th in the Grand Prix. She also earned €3,450 in a 1m50 one-round competition. Romanov earned €2,500 for finishing 4th in a 1m45 one-round class.

CSI5* GCT Valencia, Spain: Tinka's Serenade earned €4,600 in a 1m50 two-round class on the final day for second place. In a 1m45 class on Saturday, Romanov led for a long time, but in the end took 4th prize of €2,300. The pair also picked up €1,035 for 6th position in the final 1m45 speed class.

Major results
2012
4th, Grand Prix – CSI5* GCT Doha, Qatar (Tinka's Serenade)
3rd, Grand Prix – CSI5* Paris, France (Tinka's Serenade)
4th, Rolex FEI World Cup – CSI5*-W Leipzig, Germany (Tinka's Serenade)
2nd, 'Citroen' Prize – CSI5*-W Leipzig, Germany (Tinka's Serenade)
4th, Grand Prix – CSI5* Basel, Switzerland (Tinka's Serenade)
2011
1st, Rolex IJRC Top Ten Final, Gucci Masters Paris, France (Tinka's Serenade)
2nd, 'Mercedes' Masters – CSI5*-W Stuttgart, Germany (Tinka's Serenade)
3rd, Masters – CSI5* Lyon, France (Tinka's Serenade)
1st, FEI Nations Cup – CSIO5* La Baule, France (Romanov)
1st, Grand Prix – CSI5*-GCT Valencia, Spain, (Je t'Aime Flamenco)
2nd, Grand Prix – CSI3* Leipzig, Germany, (Romanov)
Rolex Grand Prix – CSI5*-W Zurich, Switzerland, (Tinka's Serenade)
Grand Prix – CSI5* Basel, Switzerland, (Tinka's Serenade)
2010
2nd, Rolex FEI World Cup qualifier – CSI5*-W London Olympia, England, (Tinka's Serenade)
3rd, Rolex FEI World Cup Qualifier – CSI5*-W Stuttgart German Masters, (Tinka's Serenade)
Grand Prix – Barcelona CSI5*, Barcelona, Spain, (Je t'Aime Flamenco)
3rd, Longines Grand Prix, Dublin, Ireland, (Je t'Aime Flamenco)
Meydan FEI Nations Cup of Aachen, Germany, (Tinka's Serenade)
FEI Nations Cup of Belgium – CSIO4* Lummen, Belgium, (Tinka's Serenade)
Grand Prix – Amsterdam CSI4*, Amsterdam, Holland, (Je T'aime Flamenco)
2009
2nd, Grand Prix – CSIO4* Barcelona, Spain, (Tinka's Serenade)
Grand Prix – St. Gallen CSIO5*, St. Gallen, Switzerland, (Je T'aime Flamenco)
Grand Prix – Amsterdam CSI4*, Amsterdam, Holland, (Je T'aime Flamenco)
2008
2nd, Grand Prix – CSI3* Oldenburg, Germany, (Je T'aime Flamenco)
Grand Prix – Belfast CSI3*, Belfast, Northern Ireland, (Je T'aime Flamenco)
Grand Prix – Horse of the Year Show CSI3*, Birmingham, United Kingdom, (Je T'aime Flamenco)
3rd, Grand Prix – CSI4* Sunshine Tour, Vejer de la Frontera, Spain, (Tinka's Serenade)
2007
3rd, Grand Prix – Horse of the Year Show CSI3*, Birmingham, United Kingdom, (Tinka's Serenade)
Grand Prix – St. Tropez CSI3*, St. Tropez, France, (Anastasia)
2nd, Grand Prix – CSI4* British Open, Birmingham, United Kingdom, (Anastasia)
2006
2nd, Grand Prix – CSI3* Belfast, Northern Ireland, (Anastasia)
2nd, Grand Prix – Horse of the Year Show CSI3*, Birmingham, United Kingdom, (Anastasia)
Grand Prix – CSI3* Sunshine Tour, Vejer de la Frontera, Spain, (Anastasia)
2nd, Grand Prix – CSI3* Sunshine Tour, Vejer de la Frontera, Spain, (Whinny Jackson)
2005
Grand Prix – CSI2* Lier, Belgium, (Whinny Jackson)

References

 http://www.horsesportireland.com

External links
 
 Official website

1977 births
Living people
Irish male equestrians
Olympic equestrians of Ireland
Equestrians at the 2012 Summer Olympics